Sporobolus anglicus (common cordgrass) is a species of cordgrass that originated in southern England in about 1870 and is a neonative species in Britain. It was reclassified as Sporobolus anglicus after a taxonomic revision in 2014, but Spartina anglica is still in common usage. It is an allotetraploid species derived from the hybrid Sporobolus × townsendii, which arose when the European native cordgrass Sporobolus maritimus (Small Cordgrass) hybridised with the introduced American Sporobolus alterniflorus (Smooth Cordgrass).

It produces flowers and seeds on only one side of the stalk. The flowers are a yellowish-green, turning brown by the winter.

Invasive problems
Sporobolus anglica was at first seen as a valuable new species for coastal erosion control, its dense root systems binding coastal mud and the stems increasing silt deposition, thereby assisting in land reclamation from the sea. As a result, it was widely planted at coastal sites throughout the British Isles, and has colonised large areas of tidal mudflats, becoming an invasive species. New colonies may take some time to become established, but once they do, vegetative spread by rhizomes is rapid, smothering natural ecosystems and preventing birds such as waders from feeding. In some areas, however, a natural dieback of unknown cause has reversed the spread, and artificial control is no longer necessary where this dieback has occurred.

It has also been introduced to Asia, Australia, New Zealand and North America, where it has proved to be a serious invasive species causing extensive damage to natural saltmarsh ecosystems in all areas.

Further reading
Smiddy, P. 2020.The status and distribution of Common Cord-grass (Spartina anglica) at Dungarvan, Co. Waterford, and an evaluation of ecological effects. Irish Naturalists' Journal. 37:9 - 13.

See also
Invasive grasses of North America

References

External links
UK Joint Nature Conservation Committee: Spartina anglica
English Nature: Spartina summary
San Francisco Estuary Invasive Spartina Project

anglica